Iveta Zelingerová-Fortová (born June 21, 1972) is a Czech cross-country skier who competed from 1992 to 1998. Competing in three Winter Olympics, she earned her best finishes at Albertville with sixth overall in the 4 × 5 km relay and 18th individually in the 5 km event.

Zelingerová's best finish at the FIS Nordic World Ski Championships was 18th in the 15 km event at Thunder Bay, Ontario in 1995. Her best World Cup finish was 12th in a 30 km event in Italy in 1992.

Zelingerová's lone career victory was in a 5 km FIS Race in the Czech Republic in 1997.

Cross-country skiing results
All results are sourced from the International Ski Federation (FIS).

Olympic Games

World Championships

World Cup

Season standings

References

External links 

Women's 4 × 5 km cross-country relay Olympic results: 1976–2002 

1972 births
Living people
Czech female cross-country skiers
Czechoslovak female cross-country skiers
Cross-country skiers at the 1992 Winter Olympics
Cross-country skiers at the 1994 Winter Olympics
Cross-country skiers at the 1998 Winter Olympics
Olympic cross-country skiers of Czechoslovakia
Olympic cross-country skiers of the Czech Republic
People from Ústí nad Orlicí
Sportspeople from the Pardubice Region